Vinylphenol reductase is an enzyme that catalyses the reaction :

4-vinylphenol + NAD+ + 3 H+ ⇔ 4-ethylphenol + NADH

It is found in Brettanomyces bruxellensis, a yeast responsible of the presence of ethyl phenols in wine formed from p-coumaric acid.

See also 
 Wine chemistry
 Yeast in winemaking

References

External links 
 Vinylphenol reductase on MetaCyc

Oxidoreductases